Ain't It Beautiful is the second studio album by rock band ZO2. The album was released August 7, 2007.

Track listing 
 "Isolate" (Bob Held, David Zablidowsky, Paulie Zablidowsky) – 4:36
 "She Believes" (Bob Held, David Zablidowsky, Paulie Zablidowsky)  – 5:18
 "If You See Kay" (Bob Held, Paulie Zablidowsky) – 5:11
 "Ain't It Beautiful" (Bob Held, Paulie Zablidowsky) – 5:00
 "Comin' Home" (Bob Held, David Zablidowsky, Paulie Zablidowsky) – 5:46
 "Everywhere" (Bob Held, David Zablidowsky, Paulie Zablidowsky) – 4:42
 "Get Up Now" (Bob Held, Paulie Zablidowsky) – 3:53
 "Don't Mind" (Bob Held, David Zablidowsky) – 4:48
 "Get the Led Out" (Bob Held, Paulie Zablidowsky) – 4:22
 "Hopelessly Gone" (Bob Held, David Zablidowsky, Paulie Zablidowsky) – 4:02
 "On the Verge of War" (Bob Held, Paulie Zablidowsky) – 4:15

Personnel 
Paul "Paulie Z" Zablidowsky – vocals, guitar
David "David Z" Zablidowsky – vocals, bass guitar
Joey Cassata – drums, percussion, vocals

References 

2007 albums
ZO2 albums